Wilmslow is a market town and civil parish in the unitary authority of Cheshire East in Cheshire, England,  south of Manchester city centre. The population was 24,497 at the 2011 Census.

History

Toponymy
Wilmslow derives its name from Old English Wīghelmes hlāw = "mound of a man called Wīghelm."

Lindow Man
Much about the local Iron Age history of Wilmslow was uncovered with the discovery of Lindow Man, in Lindow Moss. Preserved in the peat bogs for 2,000 years, Lindow Man is one of the most important Iron Age finds in the country. Despite a campaign to keep Lindow Man in the area, he was transferred to the British Museum and is a central feature of the Iron Age exhibition. Lindow Man returned to Manchester Museum in April 2008 for a year-long exhibition.

Recent history
An IRA bomb exploded near the railway station in March 1997, damaging signalling equipment. The original IRA message was confusing and led to the evacuation of the Wilmslow Police Station to the local leisure centre not far from the explosion. Nobody was hurt.

In the general election of the same year, the parliamentary constituency of Tatton, in which Wilmslow falls, made headlines as part of the "sleaze" accusations levelled against the then Conservative Government. Tatton MP, Neil Hamilton, was accused of accepting cash for tabling Parliamentary questions, and subsequently defeated in the election by independent candidate Martin Bell. Bell was supported in his door to door canvassing for votes by David Soul and served a single term as MP.

Administrative history
Wilmslow was one of the eight ancient parishes of the Macclesfield Hundred of Cheshire. It was subdivided into the townships of Bollinfee, Chorley, Fulshaw and Pownall Fee. Under the Poor Law Amendment Act 1866 the townships became civil parishes in their own right. Wilmslow was recreated as a civil parish on 30 September 1894 when Pownall Fee and Fulshaw were abolished. Wilmslow gained most of Bollinfee, most of Fulshaw and part of Pownall Fee; the rest of Fulshaw became part of the much reduced Bollinfee civil parish, in Alderley Edge Urban District, while the other  of Pownall Fee were used to create the new Styal civil parish. The Wilmslow Urban District Council came into being in 1895 consisting only of the newly formed civil parish of Wilmslow. On 21 June 1951 it was granted its own Coat of Arms. On 1 April 1974 Wilmslow became part of Macclesfield Borough and on 1 April 2009 it became part of the Cheshire East unitary authority.

Expansion
On 1 April 1936, Wilmslow lost  to Alderley Edge. However it gained  from Chorley and on the abolition of Bollinfee, Handforth and Styal civil parishes it gained 1,080 and  respectively.

Wilmslow along with other towns such as Whitworth, Poynton and Alderley Edge successfully objected to being part of the metropolitan county Greater Manchester when it was formed in 1974 although the town does form part of the Greater Manchester Urban Area.

Demography

Population and ethnicity
According to the United Kingdom Census 2001 the wards of Wilmslow North and Wilmslow South have a combined population of 25,498, of which 13,400 (52.5%) are females and 12,098 (47.5%) are males. In addition, 5197 (20.4%) are aged 16 and under while 4780 (18.8%) are aged 65 and over.

Ethnic white groups (British, Irish, other) account for 95.9% of the population, with ethnic minority groups accounting for 4.1% of the population.

Religion

A breakdown of religious groups and denominations:
Christian – 76.7% (19,567 people)
Muslim – 1.4% (363 people)
Jewish – 0.7% (182 people)
Hindu – 0.7% (168 people)
Buddhist – 0.4% (94 people)
Sikh – 0.2% (39 people)
Any Other Religion – 0.2% (58 people)
No Religion – 13.3% (3,390 people)
Religion Not Stated – 6.1% (1,555 people)

Places of worship
There are three Church of England churches in Wilmslow, St. Bartholomew's, St Anne's and St John's. St Bartholomew's is a 16th-century building, which was modified in the 19th century. It has a turreted bell tower. The first rector of the church was a Thomas Dale, who is buried beneath a headstone presumably engraved by him outside the entrance to the church.

Wilmslow Methodist Church occupies a modern building close to the town centre, replacing an 1886 building which itself replaced the original 1798 church, built 7 years after John Wesley's death.

The Sacred Heart & St Teresa's Church is the Roman Catholic church and dates from the late 19th century.

Initially Presbyterian, it is now a Unitarian chapel.

There is also a United Reformed Church in Wilmslow close to the town centre.

Geography
Situated in the North of England, 11 miles (18 km) from Manchester city centre and 7 miles (11 km) from Macclesfield, Wilmslow town centre is focused upon Bank Square, Grove Street and Water Lane. Although Bank Square has traditionally provided the location for many of the town's banks, the name in fact originates from the bank, or slope, leading down to the Carrs and up towards the railway station. The River Bollin flows through The Carrs Park and once provided the power source for nearby Quarry Bank Mill, now a National Trust site, and enjoyment for the local population.

Before the railway came in 1842, Wilmslow comprised only a few farms and a church.

For purposes of the Office for National Statistics, Wilmslow forms part of the Greater Manchester Urban Area.

Economy
The town is part of the Golden Triangle together with Alderley Edge and Prestbury. It grew in popularity in the Victorian era as a desirable area for wealthy North West (most generally Manchester) merchants to move out to once the railways arrived and connected the towns.

Wilmslow is the founding location of clothing giant Umbro which has its headquarters in the area.

The town is a key location for Royal London, the mutual financial services company. The Information Commissioner's Office, one of the government's executive agencies, is also based in Wilmslow.

The UK headquarters of Waters Corporation, an American manufacturer of analytical laboratory instruments, is located on Altrincham Road in Wilmslow, at the site of Huntingdon Life Sciences' Stamford Lodge facility, which was demolished in 2012.

Wilmslow and its close surroundings are served by several car showrooms of notable marques. These include Aston Martin, Porsche, Ferrari, Jaguar, Maserati, Land Rover, Bentley, McLaren, Rolls-Royce and Lamborghini. The town's Aston Martin dealership sells the highest number of Aston Martins in the UK; a high demand stimulated largely by the high level of affluence in the town.

Recreation and sport
The town has a number of parks including The Carrs Park.

Wilmslow held its first Scarecrow Festival in July 2010 with 85 local businesses taking part and 93 different scarecrows. The week-long festival is organised by the Rotary Club of Wilmslow Dean and the members of the Wilmslow Business Group.

The Wilmslow Festive 10k, organised by Run North West, takes place at the end of November each year. The run starts in Wilmslow town centre with 2479 finishers in 2017. The Wilmslow Half Marathon is an annual half marathon road running race, established in 1984 and usually run in March.

Transport
Wilmslow railway station is situated where the electrified line from Crewe to Manchester Piccadilly divides. One line continues to Manchester via Handforth, Cheadle Hulme and Stockport, the other continues to Manchester Piccadilly via Styal, Manchester Airport and Heald Green. The latter route is commonly known as the Styal Line. There are frequent services to Manchester, Alderley Edge, Crewe and Manchester Airport, plus a frequent service operated by Transport for Wales to Milford Haven, via Shrewsbury and Cardiff. In addition, there is an infrequent daily service to Bournemouth via Birmingham, operated by CrossCountry. There is also a regular hourly service direct to London Euston, operated by Avanti West Coast.

Wilmslow has two regular bus routes, which are:

 88 Altrincham-Wilmslow-Knutsford service (Monday - Saturday hourly) 
 130 Parrs Wood - Macclesfield (Monday - Saturday hourly)

There are no longer any bus services towards the airport, Stockport or Manchester or any Sunday or Bank Holiday bus services.

The town is served by a number of bus services, with the main bus interchange being at Bank Square:

The A34 Manchester to Newcastle-under-Lyme and Winchester road now bypasses the town centre to the east. Manchester Airport lies just four miles (6 km) along the A538 to the north west, but Wilmslow lies away from the approach and departure routes and therefore does not suffer from aircraft noise as Hale Barns and Heald Green do.

The A34 bypass is the main road network that serves the town of Wilmslow. This was extended beyond neighbouring Alderley Edge in Winter 2010–11. The A34 Bypass joins the A555 at Handforth Dean and this road has recently been extended to Manchester Airport.

Notable people 

 James Upton (1670 in Wilmslow – 1749) an English clergyman, schoolmaster, and literary editor.
 Samuel Finney (1719 in Wilmslow – 1798) an English miniature-painter.
 James Tait (1863 – 1944 in Wilmslow) an English medieval historian, noted for his retiring, scholarly life in Wilmslow.
 William Ewart Gladstone FRS, FSS (1809 – 1898) politician, statesman and Prime Minister four separate times, lived at the Wilmslow Rectory between January and April 1828 to study under the supervision of Reverend John Turner.
 Alan Turing OBE FRS (1912 – 1954 in Wilmslow) computer science pioneer and driving force behind the Bombe machine for cracking the German Enigma cypher, is perhaps Wilmslow's most notable resident. In 2004, a blue plaque was placed on his house in his honour.
 Patrick George (1923 in Wilmslow – 2016) an English painter who taught at the Slade School of Fine Art
 Roger Thatcher CB (1926 – 2010) a British statistician, spent his formative early years in Wilmslow
 Antony Grey (1927 in Wilmslow – 2010) pioneer gay rights activist
 Alan Garner OBE (born 1934), an author known for his books The Owl Service, The Weirdstone of Brisingamen and The Moon of Gomrath, the last two of which are set in nearby Alderley Edge.
 Richard Evans (born 1945 in Wilmslow) a graphic designer, photographer and illustrator
 John Harris (born 1969 in Wilmslow) a British journalist, writer, and critic.
 Ronald Brunskill (1929 – 2015) architectural historian

Acting & Broadcasting

 Stuart Hall (born 1929) a TV presenter convicted of indecent assault, lived in Wilmslow from 1958 to 2013.
 William Roache OBE (born 1932 in Ilkeston) actor in Coronation Street since its inception in 1960. Roache has lived in Wilmslow for most of his adult life.
 John Waite (born 1951) a presenter on British radio and TV, attended Wilmslow County Grammar School for Boys
 Barbara Wilshere (born 1959) a British actress who has appeared in theatre, films and television, attended Wilmslow County Grammar School for Girls
 Jo Wheeler (born 1963) an English weather forecaster for Sky News, attended Wilmslow County Grammar School for Girls
Evie Lewis (born 1969) mayor from 1972 to 1998
 Fionnuala Ellwood (born 1964) an actress, portrayed Lynn Whiteley in the ITV soap Emmerdale, attended Wilmslow County Grammar School for Girls 
 Journalist and broadcaster Miranda Sawyer (born 1967) and her brother, actor Toby (born 1969) were born and grew up in Wilmslow
 Chris Hawkins (born 23 September 1975) and his wife Clare Nasir (born 1970) both presenters and journalists, have lived in Wilmslow since 2012.
 Simon Gregson (born 1974) actor who plays taxi boss Steve McDonald in Coronation Street.
 Ashley Taylor Dawson (born 1982) an English actor and singer, plays Darren Osborne in the British Channel 4 soap opera Hollyoaks, also owns a night club in Wilmslow. 
 John Junior (born 1988), is a British mental health activist, who starred in Hollyoaks IRL series. Lives in Wilmslow.

Football
 Len Butt
 Edwin Dutton
 Sir Alex Ferguson
 Park Ji-Sung
 Terry Nicholl
 Danny Whitaker

Other Sport

 Andy Fanshawe (born 1963–1992) a British mountaineer, attended Wilmslow Grammar School
 Liz Blatchford (born 1980 in Wilmslow) an English professional triathlete
 David Horsey (born 1985) an English professional golfer who currently plays on the European Tour, lives in Wilmslow
 Sam James (born 1994 in Wilmslow) an English rugby union player, currently playing with the Sale Sharks

Music

 Syd Lawrence (1923 in Wilmslow – 1998) was a British bandleader
 Michael Rother (born 1950) founder of Krautrock legends Neu, lived in Wilmslow as a 9-year-old. Rother has mentioned fond memories of his time in Wilmslow during interviews and mentioned the town and the River Bollin during a 2009 BBC Four documentary 'Krautrock:the Rebirth of Germany'.
 Christopher Gayford (born 1963 in Wilmslow) an English conductor, currently with the City of Sheffield Youth Orchestra
 Indie rock band Doves met at Wilmslow High School in the 1980s. Their song "Black and White Town" was inspired by Wilmslow and its contradicting 'rich-poor' divide. 
 Matty Healy Lead vocalist of Indie rock band The 1975.

Business and commerce
 Peter Jones, the owner of the Emerson Group, a property business, whose 2012 letting of Sandfield House to law firm Roberts Jackson was reportedly Wilmslow's biggest office deal in five years lives in Wilmslow.
 Iqbal Ahmed OBE (born 1956) the owner of the Seamark group's Asian food business, based in Manchester, lives in Wilmslow.

See also

 Listed buildings in Wilmslow
 Wilmslow Hockey Club
 RAF Wilmslow
 George Bramwell Evens

References

External links

 Wilmslow.org.uk
 Wilmslow.co.uk

 
Towns in Cheshire